Hanosaurus is an extinct genus of marine reptiles that existed during the Triassic period in what is now China. The type species is Hanosaurus hupehensis.

Discovery
Hanosaurus (lizard of Han River) was discovered from the Sonshugo locality of Hubei, China. It was found at the second member of the Jialingjiang Formation. The type specimen consisted of a skull, complete hindlimbs and pelvis, incomplete shoulder girdle represented by coracoid and clavicle, and an articulated but incomplete vertebral column. It was initially described as a thalattosaur but subsequent research showed it was more likely to be a sauropterygia.

A more complete referred specimen was described in 2022 from the Yingzishan locality of Hubei, China. The specimen was also found at the second member of the Jialingjiang formation. It consisted of almost the entire skeleton preserved with its ventral side up. However, a later study has cast doubt on the referral of this specimen to Hanosaurus.

Phylogenetic placement
Rippel’s 1998 reassessment recovered Hanosaurus within a monophyletic pachypleurosaurid in a phylogenetic analysis featuring diapsids. Its placement within Sauropterygia, however, was rather inconsistent between different subsequent studies. Some studies support Rippel 1998’s pachypleurosaur placement; some found it to be more closely related to Nothosauridae than other pachypleurosaurs; some found it to be the sister taxon to a clade consisted of Nothosauridae and Pachypleurosauridae; some found it to be the sister taxon to eosauropterygia; while some recovered it to be a basal sauropterygia or outside of Sauropterygia altogether.

Taxonomy
Rippel 1998 diagnosed Hanosaurus as a small pachypluerosaurid with the following features:

 Nasal bigger than frontal
 Frontal fused in adults
 Pineal foramen placed more anteriorly 
 Pubis and ischium with rounded edge, no thyroid fenestra

Following the description of the referred specimen and the placement of the taxon being the most basal sauropterygiform (a clade that includes sauropterygia, Helveticosaurus, and Saurosphargidae), Wang et al diagnosed Hanosaurus as a medium sized sauropterygiform with the following characteristics:

 Snout without constriction
 Supratemporal fenestra smaller than orbits
 Nasals longer than frontals
 Mandibular articulation far posterior to the occiput, with retroarticular  process well developed
 Anterior teeth short and conical
 Posterior teeth constricted at the base, with the lingual surface of tooth crown slightly concave
 Cervical ribs with anterior process
 Dorsal ribs pachyostotic
 Coracoid not waisted (Note: The holotype has a waisted coracoid)
 Pubis extremely round
 Ischium kidney shaped
 No distinctive thyroid fenestra between pubis and ischium 
 Minimally four carpals and three tarsals

Wolniewicz et al 2022, however, pointed out the difference between coracoid morphology between the referred specimen and the holotype, with the former having a circular shape and the latter having a waisted shape similar to that of other sauropterygias. They also pointed out that the referred specimen and holotype were not recovered as sister taxon to each other in their phylogenetic analyses. If this is correct, then the previous diagnosis can no longer be used as it’s partly based on the referred specimen. They instead suggested that the referred specimen might be that of "Lariosaurus" sanxiaensis, a larger sauropterygia from the same formation based on similar coracoid morphology.

Lifestyle (Based on the referred specimen)
Despite being a basal sauropterygia, Hanosaurus probably did not go on land frequently and was mostly aquatic based on features such as pachyostoic ribs and reduced pelvis that likely could not support it on land. 

Wang et al 2022 suggested that Hanosaurus was an axial swimmer based on its longer trunk and smaller limbs compared to other sauropterygias, which were generally considered to be paraxial swimmers. The speculation about its lifestyle was mostly based on the referred specimen, which as noted by the section above might belong to another species.

Environment & Associated fauna
Hanosaurus was found in the second member of the Jialingjiang Formation, which was suggested to represent a lagoon deposit close to sea based on the way water depth changed between localities.

Hanosaurus was part of the Nanzhang-Yuan’an fauna. The fauna also contained other sauropterygians (“Lariosaurus” sanxiaensis, Keichousaurus yunnanensis, and an unnamed large eosauropterygian), Saurosphargidae (Pomolispondylus and a new species being described), ichthyosaur (Chaohusaurus zhangjiawanensis), and hupesuchias (Hupehsuchus, Nanchangosaurus, Parahupehsuchus, Eohupehsuchus, and Eretmorhipis), the last of which was only present in this faunal assemblage. Not much is known about the ecology of Hanosaurus, although small pachypleurosaurs were suggested to be small invertebrate predators based on jaw musculatures.

References

See also

Triassic sauropterygians
Fossil taxa described in 1972
Fossils of China
Taxa named by Yang Zhongjian
Sauropterygian genera